Yaariv Khaykin is a Canadian cardiologist and a clinical researcher in the area of electrophysiology. He is the director of the Newmarket Electrophysiology Research Group at the Southlake Regional Health Centre. He has published research into complex ablation and pioneered cardiac ablation methods.

Education
Khaykin attended the University of Toronto, completing his medical degree in 1996. He later did residency in internal medicine as well as a fellowship in cardiovascular medicine at the University of Toronto. He also trained in electrophysiology at the Cleveland Clinic.

Career
Khaykin joined Southlake Regional Health Center in 2004 as an electrophysiologist. He started a complex ablation program there, developing it into one of the most successful ablation programs in  Canada, performing the second highest number of procedures each year.

Khaykin currently directs the Newmarket Electrophysiology Research Group at Southlake. Khaykin co-founded the Canadian Atrial Fibrillation and the Complex Ablation Alliance steering committees. As a member of the group he has contributed to the development of national registries for atrial fibrillation and ventricular tachycardia. Khaykin was also a member of the Arrhythmia Management Committee of the Cardiovascular Care Network, as well as the Publication Committee for the Institute for Clinical Evaluative Sciences''' Implantable cardioverter-defibrillator registry, Ontario's version of the National Cardiovascular Data Registry.

As a cardiologist Khaykin specializes in the implantation of pacemakers, implantable cardioverter-defibrillator (ICDs), cardiac resynchronization therapy (CRT), laser lead extraction and ablation of atrial fibrillation and ventricular tachycardia, among other cardiac services.

Khaykin has been involved in collaborative research into a variety of themes related to cardiovascular health. He has researched into atrial fibrillation and complex ablation at the Southlake Regional Health Centre. Since 2004 he has been conducting clinical research into antiarrhythmic agents, cardiac rhythm management devices, coronary angiography, electrophysiology, ablation procedures and imaging and mapping technologies. His research has compared various methods to treat atrial fibrillation and ventricular tachycardia using 3D, ultrasound guidance, radiofrequency and other techniques.

Khaykin and a fellow electrophysiologist, Atul Verma, were the first cardiologists in Canada to use "a revolutionary technology that makes it easier to connect with human tissue when guiding catheters into the heart to treat problem areas, reducing patient risk while improving outcomes". The technology takes "precise electrical measurements at the tip of a cardiac catheter, providing cardiac specialists with both numbers and a visual display so they know when good tip-to-tissue contact is made".

Khaykin was also the first Canadian doctor to use the Medtronic Ablation Frontiers Cardiac Ablation System, radiofrequency ablation method applied to the treatment of atrial fibrillation.

Publications
Khaykin, in collaboration with other researchers, has published several peer-reviewed articles and given a number of presentations in the field of cardiac electrophysiology. His publications include the following:

  
 
 
 
 
 
 
 
 
 
 
 

Patents
 Khaykin, along with Gal Hayam, Limor Elran and Aharon Turgeman, invented and holds a patent for an Automated analysis of complex fractionated electrograms'', a "method for mapping abnormal electrical activity" in the heart. The method is able to identify and analyze complex fractionated electrograms (CFEs).

References

Canadian cardiologists
Living people
University of Toronto alumni
Year of birth missing (living people)